Todor Simov (born on 26 January 1985 in Sofia) is a former Bulgarian football striker. He is currently working as coach in the Levski Sofia Academy and also managed the senior team on a caretaker basis in 2018.

External links
Official website

1985 births
Living people
Bulgarian footballers
PFC Levski Sofia players
PFC Cherno More Varna players
PFC Lokomotiv Mezdra players
FC Sportist Svoge players
OFC Pirin Blagoevgrad players
First Professional Football League (Bulgaria) players
Association football forwards